John Hurst Butt (30 October 1850 – 1939) was a British sport shooter who competed at the 1908 Summer Olympics and the 1912 Summer Olympics.

In the 1908 Olympics he won a bronze medal in the team trap shooting event and was 24th in the individual trap shooting event. Four years later, he won a silver medal in the team clay pigeons event and was 19th in the trap event.

References

1850 births
1939 deaths
British male sport shooters
Trap and double trap shooters
Olympic shooters of Great Britain
Shooters at the 1908 Summer Olympics
Shooters at the 1912 Summer Olympics
Olympic silver medallists for Great Britain
Olympic bronze medallists for Great Britain
Olympic medalists in shooting
Medalists at the 1908 Summer Olympics
Medalists at the 1912 Summer Olympics
20th-century British people